The canton of Lorrez-le-Bocage-Préaux is a French former administrative division, located in the arrondissement of Fontainebleau, in the Seine-et-Marne département (Île-de-France région). It was disbanded following the French canton reorganisation which came into effect in March 2015. It consisted of 16 communes, which joined the canton of Nemours in 2015.

Demographics

Composition
The canton of Lorrez-le-Bocage-Préaux was composed of 16 communes:

Blennes
Chevry-en-Sereine
Diant
Égreville
Flagy
Lorrez-le-Bocage-Préaux
Montmachoux
Noisy-Rudignon
Paley
Remauville
Saint-Ange-le-Viel
Thoury-Férottes
Vaux-sur-Lunain
Villebéon
Villemaréchal
Voulx

See also
Cantons of the Seine-et-Marne department
Communes of the Seine-et-Marne department

References

Lorrez le bocage preaux
2015 disestablishments in France
States and territories disestablished in 2015